Gatesian is an eponymous adjective and may refer to:

Bill Gates (born 1955), American businessman and co-founder of Microsoft Corporation
Henry Louis Gates (born 1950), American critic and scholar